Brepholoxa is a genus of stink bugs in the family Pentatomidae. There is one described species in Brepholoxa, B. heidemanni.

References

Further reading

 
 

Pentatomidae genera
Articles created by Qbugbot
Pentatomini